The name Japanese privet may refer to either of two species of privet native to Japan:

 Ligustrum japonicum, also called wax leaf privet
 Ligustrum ovalifolium, also called golden privet